Pindoba is a municipality located in the center of the Brazilian state of Alagoas. Its population was 2,905 (2020) and its area is 83 km².

References

Municipalities in Alagoas